The 2007 World Series of Poker (WSOP) began on June 1st, 2007.  The $10,000 (US) no-limit Texas hold 'em Main Event began on July 6th and was completed on the morning of July 18th. All events were held at the Rio All Suite Hotel and Casino in Las Vegas, Nevada by Harrah's Entertainment, which has run the annual event since its purchase from the Binion family in 2004.

For the first time players began each event with double the amount of chips as the buy-in. This means that players in the Main Event started with 20,000 chips. The blind structure has also been increased and some blind levels removed but slowed to allow for more play.

In addition to the $50,000 H.O.R.S.E. event, which was first played at the 2006 World Series of Poker, this year there were 2 additional H.O.R.S.E. events with lower buy-ins ($2,500 and $5,000).

Tom Schneider, who won 2 events and made 1 other final table, won the Player of the Year Award. Michael Binger and Chad Brown led all other players with eight money finishes.

The annual celebrity event was changed this year, as it became a pro and celeb event called "Ante Up for Africa", hosted by actor Don Cheadle and poker pro Annie Duke.  The final two players, Dan Shak and Brandon Moran, agreed to share first place and donate all prize money to charities in Darfur.

The last woman standing of the 2007 Main Event was Maria Ho who finished in 38th place.

Also this year, KEM Plastic Playing Cards were once again used for the events, rather than Copag brand plastic playing cards, which were used during the 2005 and 2006 World Series of Poker.

Event schedule

2007 records
 Steve Billirakis became the youngest person to ever win a WSOP bracelet at 21 years and 11 days.  This record was broken three months later at the World Series of Poker Europe by Annette Obrestad, aged 18 years, 364 days.
 Phil Hellmuth became the first player to win 11 bracelets.
 Phil Hellmuth set a record of 63 all-time WSOP cashes.
 June 9 was the busiest WSOP day ever, with 3,009 participants starting in two events on the same day.
 The largest non-WSOP Main Event tournament record was broken. The $1500 Buy In No Limit Hold'em Event #49 attracted a record 3151 players for the noon start. This event broke the single busiest start date set on June 9.
 Annie Duke set the women's record with 33 WSOP cashes.
 1,286 women set a new record for number of participants in an all women's poker tournament.
 The 2007 WSOP also boasted the largest number of total registrants in history, with 54,288 registrations for all of the events.
 Michael Binger and Chad Brown tied Chris Ferguson, Phil Hellmuth and Humberto Brenes for most ITM finishes in a single World Series of Poker with eight.

Main Event

The $10,000 No Limit Hold'em Main Event began on July 6 with the first of four separate starting days. 6,358 players entered, 2,415 fewer than in 2006. This is the first time since 1992 that the Main Event experienced a reduction in participants.  As the total number of registrants for the 2007 WSOP set a record at 54,288 with a total prize pool of $159,796,918 ($59,784,954 for the Main Event), the decrease in the number of participants in the Main Event has been attributed to a recent law that limits Internet gambling.  As a result of this law, Harrah's did not allow online poker websites to directly purchase Main Event seats and offer them as prizes, if the sites conducted business with US citizens. Online entries to the Main Event that were won as prizes on Internet poker sites were a substantial contributor to the dramatic growth the Main Event seen in 2003, 2004, 2005 and 2006.  The reduced field also meant a  nearly one-third reduction in the Main Event's grand prize, from the record $12 million (US) in 2006 to $8.25 million.

A flatter payout structure was introduced in 2007 further reducing the prize money awarded to the final table finishers.  Players who busted early in the money received a larger share than they would have in 2006. The lowest payouts in 2007 were $20,320 (just over double the buyin), as compared to $14,597 in 2006.  Every player who made the final table in 2006 won over 1.5 million dollars.

A minor controversy arose during the main event.  The colors of the chips made it very difficult to differentiate between the chip values.  Pokernews.com posted the following note on its live reporting log, "It has literally been impossible for us to count these players' stacks due to the positioning of the cameras and the incredibly similar colors of the various chip denominations." Pokernews also reported that the chip color has affected play, "Because of the similarly-colored chips it took the dealer some time to count down Kluber's stack, and not long after Rahme began thinking about his response Kluber called the clock on him."  Other players have complained that they can't count their opponents stacks and fear asking for a chip count as speaking may reveal the strength of their hand.

Final table

*Career statistics prior to the beginning of the 2007 Main Event.

Final table results

Other notable high finishes
NB: This list is restricted to top 30 finishers with an existing Wikipedia entry.

Performance of past World Champions

Celebrities in the 2007 Main Event
Out in Day 1: Kirk Acevedo, Hank Azaria, José Canseco, Steve Davis, Shannon Elizabeth, Janet Gretzky, Norm Macdonald, A.J. McLean, Nelly, Ray Romano, Teddy Sheringham, Maxime Talbot, Antonio Tarver, Jennifer Tilly
Out in Day 2: Jason Alexander, Rene Angelil, Tomas Brolin, Brad Garrett, Rick Salomon, Rick Tocchet, Montel Williams
Out in Day 3: Todd Phillips (380th place, $34,644)
Out in Day 4: Sam Simon (329th place, $39,445), Tobey Maguire (292nd place, $39,445), Sully Erna (237th place, $45,422)

World Series of Poker Europe

Under the leadership of WSOP commissioner, Jeffrey Pollack, the World Series of Poker Europe (WSOPE) is the first expansion of the World Series of Poker. In September 2007, the first WSOP championship events outside of Las Vegas took place in London.  It was the first time that WSOP bracelets were awarded outside of Las Vegas.   Three tournaments were held, with the main event being a £10,000 buy-in no-limit hold 'em tournament. The main event was won by Norwegian online prodigy Annette Obrestad, who won on the day before her 19th birthday and became the youngest person ever to win a WSOP bracelet.

See also
2007 World Series of Poker results

References
Official 2007 World Series of Poker results and schedule

World Series of Poker
2007 in poker